is a 1983 Japanese film directed by Akiyoshi Imazeki. It is based on the novel 1980 Aiko 16 sai by Akemi Hotta.

Cast
 Yasuko Tomita
 Misa Kawai
 Hiroshi Inuzuka
 Yuki Matsushita

Reception
Yasuko Tomita won the Award for Best Newcomer at the 6th Yokohama Film Festival and at the 8th Japan Academy Prize.

References

External links
 

1983 films
Japanese drama films
Japanese high school films
Japanese teen films
Films about archery
Films based on Japanese novels
Films directed by Akiyoshi Imazeki
1980s Japanese films